Gianluca Atzori (born 6 March 1971) is an Italian football manager and former player, current coach of Floriana.

Career

Playing
Atzori started his professional playing career with Rome-based Serie C side Lodigiani in 1988, then playing mostly at Serie B level with several teams, including Perugia, Reggina and most notably Ravenna, where he spent a total four season. In 2001, he joined Empoli, being protagonist of the Tuscans' successful 2001–02 Serie B campaign which saw the team being crowned league winners under head coach Silvio Baldini. He then played another season with Empoli, in his personal first (and only) Serie A season. In 2003, he followed Silvio Baldini at Palermo, who later won the Serie B title in 2003–04; he played only 17 league games out of 46 with the rosanero, being relegated to the bench after Silvio Baldini's dismissal from the head coaching post.

Coaching
After being released by Palermo in June 2004, Atzori chose to retire from football and instead focus in a management career, becoming Silvio Baldini's assistant at Parma. He then followed again Baldini also in his unsuccessful stints at Lecce (2005–06) and Catania (2007–08), both ended in his boss and mentor being sacked in mid-season. However, after Baldini was sacked from Catania in April 2008, Atzori decided instead to stay under new boss Walter Zenga.

In June 2008 Atzori left Catania to accept a head coaching offer from Lega Pro Prima Divisione side Ravenna, a team where he had already spent four seasons as a player. He guided Ravenna through a very impressive season and qualification into promotion playoffs, where Ravenna was defeated by Padova in the semi-finals.

On 10 June 2009 Atzori accepted to return at Catania, this time as head coach, for the upcoming 2009–10 season, thus replacing his former head coach Walter Zenga at the helm of the rossoazzurri. However, his time back at Catania lasted only fifteen games, as he was dismissed on 8 December due to poor results.

On 16 June 2010 Serie B club Reggina announced Gianluca Atzori as the club's new head coach, replacing Roberto Breda.

On 9 June 2011 Atzori was named as the new head coach of Sampdoria have been relegated to Serie B, signing a two-year contract. After a disappointing start of season, with Sampdoria in seventh place despite being tipped as one of the main direct promotion candidates during pre-season, Atzori was ultimately sacked on 13 November 2011.

On 4 January 2013 he was named new coach of Spezia in Serie B en place of the sacked Michele Serena. His stint was however short-lived as he was sacked weeks later due to poor results and replaced by Luigi Cagni.

In June 2013 he was named as the new head coach of Serie B club Reggina, thus marking a personal second stint of his at the Calabrian club. He was sacked in October 2013 and replaced by Fabrizio Castori, but reinstated in December 2013.

He successively served as head coach of Serie B club Pro Vercelli from December 2017 to January 2018, in a short but unsuccessful stint in charge of the Bianche Casacche.

On 27 September 2019 he was hired by Serie C club Imolese. He left Imolese at the end of the 2019–20 season.

On 17 June 2021 Atzori has been appointed as head coach of the Maltese Premier League side Floriana F.C.

References

External links

1971 births
Living people
Sportspeople from the Province of Frosinone
Italian footballers
Italian football managers
Serie A players
Serie B players
Ternana Calcio players
A.C. Perugia Calcio players
Reggina 1914 players
Ravenna F.C. players
Empoli F.C. players
Palermo F.C. players
Ravenna F.C. managers
Catania S.S.D. managers
Reggina 1914 managers
U.C. Sampdoria managers
Serie A managers
Association football defenders
F.C. Pro Vercelli 1892 managers
Serie C managers
Floriana F.C. managers
Footballers from Lazio